The Ecovillage Training Center is a "total immersion school" for sustainability. It is located at The Farm, an intentional community/ecovillage in Summertown, Tennessee, USA. The curricula of the center are "holistic and comprehensivist" and foster hands-on learning.

Albert Bates, a long-time resident of The Farm, founded the center in July 1994. The original farmhouse was refurbished and renamed "You're Inn at The Farm," to provide accommodation for participants. There are many permaculture design and energy conservation features at the Ecovillage Training Centre that result in a significant reduction in use of resources. These include a 5-kW solar electric system, water catchment, organic gardens, greywater treatment, ponds, wetlands, and natural buildings.

In addition to offering ecovillage apprenticeships, the Training Center's curriculum includes:

Shiitake Mushroom Growing Basics
Solar Installation 
Alternative Energy Systems
Bamboo Cultivation and Construction
Ecovillage Design and Permaculture Practicum
Natural Building Basics

The center is affiliated with the Global Ecovillage Network, Gaia University and local colleges and offers college credit for several of its courses.

External links
A Training Center for Ecovillagers by Albert Bates. Communities Journal of Cooperative Living No. 91. Summer 1996.
ETC Courses
Solar training in Mumbai
Advanced Solar Training, International Educational Institute a unit of Global Advanced Training and Educational Trust
Electric Vehicle Training in India

Ecovillages
Schools in Tennessee
Educational institutions established in 1994
1994 establishments in Tennessee